Griego is a surname. Notable people with the surname include:

Eric Griego (born 1966), American politician
Jorge Griego (1504–after 1545), Greek conquistador
Phil Griego (born 1948), American politician

See also
Grego (surname)
Juan Griego, city in Venezuela